Ray Johnston may refer to:
 Ray Johnston (English footballer), English football goalkeeper
 Ray Johnston (Australian footballer), Australian rules footballer
 W. Ray Johnston, American film producer
 Raymond Johnston, member of the Rhode Island House of Representatives

See also
 Raymond Thomas Johnston, Canadian merchant and politician in Quebec